The 2003 Copa Perú season, the promotion tournament of Peruvian football.

The tournament has 5 stages. The first four stages are played as mini-league round-robin tournaments, except for third stage in region IV, which is played as a knockout stage. The final stage features two knockout rounds and a final four-team group stage to determine the two promoted teams.

The 2003 Peru Cup started with the District Stage on February.  The next stage was the Provincial Stage which started, on June. The tournament continued with the Departamental Stage on July. The Regional Staged followed. The National Stage started on November. The winner of the National Stage will be promoted to the First Division.

Regional Stage
The following list shows the teams that qualified for the Regional Stage.

Region I
Region I includes qualified teams from Amazonas, Lambayeque, Tumbes and Piura region.

Group A

Group B

Final

Region II
Region II includes qualified teams from Ancash, Cajamarca and La Libertad region.

Region III
Region III includes qualified teams from Loreto, San Martín and Ucayali region.

Region IV
Region IV includes qualified teams from Callao, Ica and Lima region.

Region V
Region V includes qualified teams from Huánuco, Junín and Pasco region.

Region VI
Region VI includes qualified teams from Apurímac, Ayacucho and Huancavelica region.

Region VII
Region VII includes qualified teams from Cusco, Madre de Dios and Puno region.

Region VIII
Region VIII includes qualified teams from Arequipa, Moquegua and Tacna region.

National Stage
The National Stage started in November. The winners of the National Stage will be promoted to the First Division.

Tiebreaker

External links
  Copa Peru 2003

Copa Perú seasons
2003 domestic association football cups
2003 in Peruvian football